Elma is a city in Howard County, Iowa, United States. The population was 505 at the time of the 2020 census.

History
Elma had its start in the late 1880s by the building of the railroad through that territory.

Geography
Elma is located at  (43.245649, -92.438598).

Demographics

2010 census
As of the census of 2010, there were 546 people, 240 households, and 142 families residing in the city. The racial makeup of the city was 96.3% White, 1.3% African American, 0.2% Pacific Islander, and 2.2% from two or more races. Hispanic or Latino of any race were 1.5% of the population.

There were 240 households, of which 22.5% had children under the age of 18 living with them, 49.6% were married couples living together, 6.7% had a female householder with no husband present, 2.9% had a male householder with no wife present, and 40.8% were non-families. 34.6% of all households were made up of individuals, and 19.6% had someone living alone who was 65 years of age or older. The average household size was 2.11 and the average family size was 2.70.

The median age in the city was 51.3 years. 19.8% of residents were under the age of 18; 3.6% were between the ages of 18 and 24; 16.5% were from 25 to 44; 29.7% were from 45 to 64; and 30.4% were 65 years of age or older. The gender makeup of the city was 47.6% male and 52.4% female.

2000 census
As of the census of 2000, there were 598 people, 242 households, and 150 families residing in the city. The racial makeup of the city was 99.33% White, 0.17% African American, 0.17% Native American, and 0.33% from two or more races.

There were 242 households, out of which 24.8% had children under the age of 18 living with them, 53.7% were married couples living together, 6.6% had a female householder with no husband present, and 38.0% were non-families. 34.7% of all households were made up of individuals, and 21.1% had someone living alone who was 65 years of age or older. The average household size was 2.23 and the average family size was 2.88.

20.6% were under the age of 18, 7.2% from 18 to 24, 21.4% from 25 to 44, 22.9% from 45 to 64, and 27.9% were 65 years of age or older. The median age was 46 years. For every 100 females, there were 88.6 males. For every 100 females age 18 and over, there were 89.2 males.

The median income for a household in the city was $27,417, and the median income for a family was $40,417. Males had a median income of $26,250 versus $19,167 for females. The per capita income for the city was $15,263. About 10.8% of families and 17.4% of the population were below the poverty line, including 20.3% of those under age 18 and 26.2% of those age 65 or over.

Schools
Howard–Winneshiek Community School District operates public schools. The district was formed from the merger of the Cresco, Lime Springs/Chester, Elma, and Ridgeway school districts, opening on July 1, 1960.

When Elma had its own K–12 school district, the Elma Eagles Basketball Team made state basketball twice in the 1930s, the first in 1932 and the second in 1937.

Jeff Skoda won state championship in wrestling in 1972 in the 112 weight class at Crestwood after the 1960 consolidation.

In 2013 the district board voted to close Elma Elementary School.

References

External links
 Introduction & history

Cities in Iowa
Cities in Howard County, Iowa